Biomicrofluidics is a bimonthly peer-reviewed scientific journal covering all aspects of research on fundamental physicochemical mechanisms associated with microfluidic, nanofluidic, and molecular/cellular biophysical phenomena in addition to novel microfluidic and nanofluidic techniques for diagnostic, medical, biological, pharmaceutical, environmental, and chemical applications. The editors-in-chief are Hsueh-Chia Chang (University of Notre Dame) and Leslie Y. Yeo (RMIT University).

Abstracting and indexing  
The journal is abstracted and indexed in the Science Citation Index, Current Contents/Physical Chemical and Earth Sciences, and BIOSIS Previews. According to the Journal Citation Reports, the journal has a 2021 impact factor of 3.258.

References

External links 
 

Fluid dynamics journals
American Institute of Physics academic journals
Bimonthly journals
Publications established in 2007
English-language journals